Sir Robert Peel, 1st Baronet (25 April 1750 – 3 May 1830), was a British politician and industrialist and one of early textile manufacturers of the Industrial Revolution. He is one of ten known British millionaires in 1799.

He was the father of Sir Robert Peel, twice Prime Minister of the United Kingdom.

Background
Peel's father Robert Peel and grandfather William Peel(e) were yeomen. They were also engaged in the adult and infant textile industry, then organised on the basis of the domestic system (most of the work being undertaken in the home).

Business career
Like many others, Peel joined partnerships to raise the capital required to set up spinning mills. These were water powered (usually using the water frame invented by Richard Arkwright), and thus by rivers and powerful streams in country districts. Thus Peel and Yates set up a mill and housing for their workers at Burrs near Bury. As elsewhere, the shortage of labour in the rural districts was mitigated by employing pauper children as 'apprentices', imported from any locality that wanted them off their hands. They were housed in a kind of hostel. Sir Robert Peel advocated for or sided with progressive reforms in legislation, worker's rights and the first near-national system of vital healthcare (poor law union workhouse trained and dedicated infirmaries) enduring through 19th century Britain and beyond.

Through employing a growing workforce and investing in owning and co-managing a cotton processing/cloth manufacturing business and a calico-printing business, he became a millionaire, and lived, as one of his two main homes, at Chamber Hall in Bury, where his more famous son was born.  Peel was listed as a subscriber to the Manchester Bolton & Bury Canal navigation in 1791. He also built the first factory in nearby Radcliffe.

Political career
In politics, Peel was a 'Church and King' Tory and a staunch supporter of William Pitt the Younger. This was unusual, as many of the Lancashire mill owners were nonconformist and radical in their outlook. In 1790 he was elected Member of Parliament for Tamworth, having bought the borough along with Lord Bath's estate in the area, and carried these principles into political life. He made Drayton Manor in Staffordshire his principal residence and started to adopt the lifestyle of a country gentleman. In 1800 he was created a Baronet, of Drayton Manor in the County of Stafford and of Bury in the County Palatine of Lancaster. Concerned at the working conditions for children in the cotton industry, and even more concerned that some of his mills had been run by their 'overseers' (managers) contrary to his own paternalistic intentions, in 1802, he introduced the Health and Morals of Apprentices Act which tended to limit the hours that apprentice children worked in the mills, and obliged the mill owners to provide some form of schooling. In 1815, at the urging of Robert Owen, he introduced a Bill introducing stricter limits on the hours children (whether or not apprentices) could work in textile mills; in 1819 this was passed (heavily amended, and applying only to the cotton industry) as the Cotton Mills and Factories Act.  In 1817, he retired from business, the various partnerships which had operated his mills being dissolved. In the 1818 General Election, Peel and his son William had been the two MPs returned by Tamworth in a contested election; in 1820 Peel left Parliament (restoring the general custom at Tamworth of returning un-contested one MP of the proprietor's choosing and one representing other local interests).

Family

Peel married his first wife Ellen Yates (the daughter of his partner) on 8 July 1783. They had eleven children, including:

Sir Robert Peel, 2nd Baronet, Prime Minister of the United Kingdom.
William Yates Peel, MP and politician. married Lady Jane Elizabeth Moore, daughter of Stephen Moore, 2nd Earl Mount Cashell and his wife Margaret King.
Edmund Peel, MP and politician 
General Jonathan Peel, soldier, politician and owner of racehorses (including 'Orlando', the winner of the 'Running Rein' Derby of 1844)
Laurence Peel (b. 1801), MP and politician, who married Lady Jane Lennox, daughter of Charles Lennox, 4th Duke of Richmond; described by one historian as "the youngest and least talented, but perhaps the most personally attractive of the Peel brothers".
Harriet Peel, who married the 2nd Baron Henley.
Mary Peel who married  George Robert Dawson (politician); great-great-grandparents to Lord Moyola.

Peel had high hopes for his children, especially his eldest son, Robert, who he would make repeat the substance of each Sunday's sermon after mass. Peel accepted that he would not mingle with high society, but intended to prepare his son to be able to.

In 1799 he (or his immediate family benefit trust) was estimated the seventh-wealthiest small family unit in Britain, owning £1.5M. He was one of ten known British millionaires in 1799.

After the death of his first wife, Peel married Susanna Clerke (sister of Sir William Clerke) on 18 October 1805. The marriage was unsuccessful and the couple eventually separated, with Susanna moving to Warwickshire. She died on 10 September 1824. Sir Robert was at the time unwell and his children represented him at the funeral.

In April 1830, Sir Robert was growing frail, though he still played whist until he was too weak to deal. He was too proud to allow his nephew to deal for him, so stopped playing. Peel died in his armchair, peacefully and without anyone noticing until hours later.

In a biography of his son Robert, by Douglas Hurd (Con), it states Peel had "a good life, well sustained by family pleasures, worldly success, orthodox Christian faith and a strong practical mind". His funeral was attended by the entire "corporation of Tamworth" and sixty tenants on horseback.

His will was a paradigm of primogeniture. He in most notable legacies left what transpired to be about £38,500 each to four of his sons, leaving Robert with all his land plus four times that sum; he had given already Robert £330,000 during his lifetime and willed him a further £154,000.

Notes

References

External links

1750 births
1830 deaths
English businesspeople
People of the Industrial Revolution
Peel baronets
British textile industry businesspeople
Members of the Parliament of Great Britain for English constituencies
British MPs 1790–1796
British MPs 1796–1800
Members of the Parliament of the United Kingdom for English constituencies
UK MPs 1801–1802
UK MPs 1802–1806
UK MPs 1806–1807
UK MPs 1807–1812
UK MPs 1812–1818
UK MPs 1818–1820
Robert
Parents of prime ministers of the United Kingdom